Lu Jinhua (25 February 1927 – 10 January 2018) was a Chinese Yue opera artist who played Sheng roles. She starred in the 1958 Yue opera film A Test of Love alongside Fu Quanxiang.

Lu Jinhua founded the Shaozhuang Troupe with Wang Wenjuan in 1947. She is considered the founder of the Lu school.

References

1927 births
2018 deaths
Yue opera actresses
20th-century Chinese actresses
Chinese film actresses
Actresses from Shanghai
Singers from Shanghai
Male impersonators in Yue opera
20th-century Chinese women singers